The Cal 21 is an American trailerable sailboat that was designed by C. William Lapworth as a cruiser and first built in 1969.

Production
The design was built by Jensen Marine/Cal Yachts, a division of Bangor Punta Corp. in the United States. Production ran from 1969 to 1976, with 500 boats completed, but it is now out of production.

Design
The Cal 21 is a recreational keelboat, built predominantly of fiberglass, with wood trim. It has a fractional sloop rig; a raked stem; a reverse transom; a transom-hung mahogany, non-folding rudder, controlled by a tiller and a swing keel. It displaces  and carries  of ballast.

The swing keel is lowered from a slot in the hull, which is then plugged with a cover that sealed the opening to reduce drag. The cable to raise the keel had to be reattached to lower or raise the keel.

The boat is normally fitted with a small  outboard motor for docking and maneuvering.

The design has sleeping accommodation for four people, with a double "V"-berth in the bow cabin and two quarter berths in the main cabin. The head is located under the "V"-berth in the bow cabin on the starboard side.

Operational history
In a 2010 review Steve Henkel wrote, "In good weather a pair of sleepers can be accommodated on her unusually spacious (eight feet long) cockpit seats, Worst features: The mahogany rudder is detachable but not folding, a potential problem in shallows. The iron keel is subject to pitting and rust. The keel hoisting system is said by some owners to be a weakness."

See also
List of sailing boat types

References

External links
Cal 21 commemorative webpage

Keelboats
1960s sailboat type designs
Sailing yachts
Trailer sailers
Sailboat type designs by Bill Lapworth
Sailboat types built by Cal Yachts